The 2011 Torneo Internazionale Regione Piemonte was a professional tennis tournament played on clay courts. It was the 12th edition of the tournament which was part of the 2011 ITF Women's Circuit. It took place in Biella, Italy between 5 and 11 September 2011.

WTA entrants

Seeds

 1 Rankings are as of August 29, 2011.

Other entrants
The following players received wildcards into the singles main draw:
  Sara Eccel
  Giulia Gatto-Monticone
  Kaia Kanepi
  Laura Thorpe

The following players received entry from the qualifying draw:
  Margalita Chakhnashvili
  Mariana Duque
  Nastja Kolar
  Tadeja Majerič

Champions

Singles

 Alexandra Cadanțu def.  Mariana Duque, 6–4, 6–3

Doubles

 Lara Arruabarrena-Vecino /  Ekaterina Ivanova def.  Janette Husárová /  Renata Voráčová, 6–3, 0–6, [10–3]

External links
Official Website
ITF Search 

Torneo Internazionale Regione Piemonte
Clay court tennis tournaments
Tennis tournaments in Italy
Torneo Internazionale Regione Piemonte